The 2014 St. Petersburg Bowl, the seventh edition of the annual game, was a college football bowl game that was played on December 26, 2014 at Tropicana Field in St. Petersburg, Florida. The game matched the NC State Wolfpack of the Atlantic Coast Conference against the American Athletic Conference co-champion UCF Knights. The game began at 8:00 p.m. EST and aired on ESPN. It was one of the 2014–15 bowl games concluding the 2014 FBS football season. The Wolfpack defeated the Knights, 34–27.

After four playings named after the Beef O'Brady's restaurant franchise, the bowl reverted to its original name, the St. Petersburg Bowl. Sponsored by online payment processor BitPay, the game was officially known as the Bitcoin St. Petersburg Bowl.

Teams
The game featured the NC State Wolfpack of the Atlantic Coast Conference and the American Athletic Conference co-champion UCF Knights.

The game represented be the third overall meeting between these two teams, with the series previously tied 1–1. The last time these two teams met was in 2010.

NC State Wolfpack

After finishing their regular season with a 7–5 record, the Wolfpack accepted their invitation to play in the game.

This game was NC State's first St. Petersburg Bowl.

UCF Knights

After finishing their regular season with a 9–3 record and winning a share of the American Athletic Conference championship, the Knights accepted their invitation to play in the game.

The game was UCF's third St. Petersburg Bowl, extending their record for most appearances in the game.  The Knights previously lost the 2009 game to the Rutgers Scarlet Knights by a score of 45–24, and they later won the 2012 Beef 'O' Brady's Bowl over the Ball State Cardinals by a score of 38–17.

Pregame buildup

NC State

Offense
The Wolfpack's offense focused on rushing the football, averaging 206 rushing yards per game, which ranked fourth in their conference; nevertheless, they were average in other areas, and were expected to struggle against UCF's stout defense. The unit was piloted by dual-threat quarterback Jacoby Brissett, who excelled at game management and keeping the offense moving by avoiding turnovers. A trio of running backs made substantial contributions to the rushing attack along with Brissett – Shadrach Thornton led the team with 811 yards and a 5.5 yards-per-carry average (ypc), Matt Dayes compiled 495 yards on 91 carries (5.4 ypc), and Tony Creecy compiled 282 yards on 52 carries (5.4 ypc). Freshman Bo Hines led an inexperienced receiving corps with 42 receptions for 537 yards, while tight end David Grinnage was second in receiving, and led the team with receiving five touchdowns. The offensive line entered the season with "three returning players with starting experience: center Luke Lathan and guard Kalani Heppe and Curtis Crouch. He also has two inexperienced tackles and an overall lack of experience and depth," and ultimately, not a single member of the line earned even honorable mention all-conference accolades. Punter Will Baumann was a first team all-conference honoree.

Game summary

Scoring summary

Source:

Statistics

Source:

References

External links
Box score at ESPN

St. Petersburg Bowl
Gasparilla Bowl
NC State Wolfpack football bowl games
UCF Knights football bowl games
St. Petersburg Bowl
St. Petersburg Bowl
21st century in St. Petersburg, Florida